Ningbo Commercial Group, or just simply Ningbo Group, is a general term describing the businessmen from Ningbo throughout history.

History
It was one of the ten largest commercial groups during the Ming and Qing dynasties, and it became the biggest commercial regional group of China in the Late Qing dynasty.

In the Ming and Qing dynasties, many Ningbo traders were active nationally and even abroad. In the Late Qing dynasty, China began industrialization, and many pioneering industrialists and entrepreneurs came from Ningbo.

Contributions
In the late Qing Dynasty, China started its nationwide industrialization under Western influence, and many Ningbo industrialists and entrepreneurs made great contributions to this change.

Notable people
Ming & Qing Dynasties:
 Yue Xianyang and his family (founder of Tong Ren Tang)

See also
 Economy of China
 Economic history of China (Pre-1911)
 Economic history of China (1912–1949)

References

Economic history of China
Economy in Ningbo